Sergi Miquel i Valentí (born 24 December 1989) is a Spanish politician from Catalonia who serves as Member of the Congress of Deputies of Spain.

Early life
Miquel was born on 24 December 1989 in Llagostera, Catalonia. He has a bachelor's degree in art and design from the University of Southampton and a degree in design from ELISAVA. He has been secretary-general of the Nationalist Youth of Catalonia (JNC) since 2015.

Career
Miquel contested the 2011 local elections as a Convergence and Union (CiU) electoral alliance candidate in Llagostera and was elected. He was re-elected at the 2015 local elections. Miquel contested the 2016 general election as a Democratic Convergence of Catalonia (CDC) candidate in the Province of Girona and was elected to the Congress of Deputies. He was re-elected at the 2019 general election as a Together for Catalonia (JxCat) candidate.

Miquel was president of the Papu Tisores Cultural Association and is a member of Òmnium Cultural and ESPLAC.

Electoral history

References

1989 births
Alumni of the University of Southampton
Catalan European Democratic Party politicians
Convergence and Union politicians
Democratic Convergence of Catalonia politicians
Gay politicians
LGBT legislators in Spain
Living people
Members of the 12th Congress of Deputies (Spain)
Members of the 13th Congress of Deputies (Spain)
Municipal councillors in the province of Girona
People from Gironès
Pompeu Fabra University alumni
Members of the 14th Congress of Deputies (Spain)
Together for Catalonia (2017) politicians